The 1985 Peach Bowl was a post-season American college football bowl game at Fulton County Stadium in Atlanta, Georgia between the Army Cadets and the University of Illinois Fighting Illini on December 31, 1985. The game was the final contest of the 1985 NCAA Division I-A football season for both teams, and ended in a 31–29 victory for Army, the second bowl victory in school history.

Game summary 
On a cold and rainy day in Atlanta, Army scored two touchdowns on halfback option plays and took advantage of four Illini turnovers to carry an eight-point lead into the final five minutes. Trailing 31–23 with less than a minute remaining, Illinois quarterback Jack Trudeau hit All-American receiver David Williams for a 54-yard touchdown to bring the Fighting Illini within two points of a tie. Trudeau's two-point conversion pass attempt was broken up by reserve safety Peel Chronister, and Army handed Illinois its third consecutive Bowl defeat in the 1980s. Trudeau set Peach Bowl records with 38 completions in 55 attempts for 401 yards, and tight end Cap Boso caught a record 9 receptions. The game saw 16 Peach Bowl records broken or tied.

Scoring summary

Statistical summary
Team Statistics

(Rushing-Passing-Total): UI - 77-401-478; ARMY - 291-94-385

Individual Statistical Leaders

Rushing (Att.-Yds.-TD): UI - Thomas Rooks 10-35-0, Wilson 8-31-1;  ARMY - Healy 23-107-1, Lampley 16-76-0, Black 15-73-1.

Passing (Att.-Comp.-Int.-TD-Yds.): UI - Trudeau 55-38-2-3-401; ARMY - Healy 6-3-1-0-35.

Receiving (No.-Yds.-TD): UI - David Williams 7-109-2, Stephen Pierce 6-92-0, Anthony Williams 5-59-0, Cap Boso 9-52-1.

References

Peach Bowl
Peach Bowl
Army Black Knights football bowl games
Illinois Fighting Illini football bowl games
December 1985 sports events in the United States